Sony α100 (DSLR-A100) is the first digital single-lens reflex camera (DSLR) marketed by Sony in 2006. It is the successor to the previous Konica Minolta DSLR models (primarily the Maxxum/Dynax 5D and 7D) through Sony's purchase of the Konica Minolta camera division. The α100 retains a similar body design and claimed improvements on Konica Minolta's Anti-Shake sensor-shifting image stabilization feature, renamed Super SteadyShot. It uses a 10.2 megapixel APS-C sized CCD sensor. Another notable feature inherited from Konica Minolta is Eyestart, which provides for automatic autofocus activation by detecting the presence of the photographer's eye on the viewfinder, thus quickening the camera's response.

Another notable feature is an automatically vibrating CCD to remove dust each time the camera is shut off. The α100 shipped from Sony and resellers by the end of July 2006 with MSRP prices of US$1000 with the 18–70 mm 3.5–f/5.6 kit lens and US$900 for the body only. The camera retains the same autofocus lens mount that was introduced with the Minolta Maxxum 7000 in 1985, allowing the continued use of the millions of existing Minolta AF lenses.

External links

100